Eduardo Schneeberger Schöfer (27 January 1911 – 27 December 1992) was a Chilean footballer. He played in three matches for the Chile national football team from 1935 to 1937. He was also part of Chile's squad for the 1935 South American Championship.

References

External links
 

1911 births
1992 deaths
Chilean footballers
Chile international footballers
Association football forwards
Colo-Colo footballers
Footballers from Santiago